The American Oncology Institute is a group of cancer hospitals in 16 locations in South Asia. The American Oncology Institute provides cancer care using international pathways and protocols for treatment.

The Institute also has an International Tumor Board, through which it implements a system in which foreign experts collaborate and advise physicians in cases where the diagnosis and treatment procedures are complex and require intervention.

History 
American Oncology Institute (a unit of Cancer Treatment Services Hyderabad Pvt Ltd) is a wholly owned subsidiary of CTSI (Mauritius) Ltd which was acquired by Varian Medical Systems, Inc (A Siemens Healthineers AG Company) in 2019.

The Institute was co-founded in 2006 by a group of physicians and industry experts associated with the University of Pittsburgh Medical College (UPMC). American Oncology Institute was started with an aim to close the gap between standards of cancer care in South Asia and the West. 

The Institute provides comprehensive cancer management. It provides clinical protocols, multidisciplinary clinical teams, an International Tumor Board, US qualified Dosimetry teams for Central Treatment Planning and service experts.

Management 
Dr. Jagprag Singh Gujral is the Group CEO of American Oncology Institute.

Locations 
The Institute is currently located at Hyderabad, Nagpur, Ludhiana, Vijayawada, Guntur, Bhubaneswar, Jalandhar, Hisar, Coimbatore, Calicut, Jammu, Imphal and Sri Lanka.

Treatments available 

Radiation Oncology
Medical Oncology
Surgical Oncology
 Head & Neck Surgery
 Neuro Onco Surgery
 Musculoskeletal Oncology
Hemato Oncology
 Pediatric Hemato Oncology
Robotic Surgery (available at Hyderabad)

External links 
Vishal Bali: A specialty touch
Varian ups presence in India with $283M acquisition
TPG to sell Cancer Treatment Services to US firm Varian for $283 mn

References 

Hospitals in Asia